Angel'in Heavy Syrup  was a Japanese psychedelic rock band formed in 1990 in Osaka. Emerging from the Japanese noise rock scene, they were influenced by krautrock bands such as Amon Düül II, but drew primarily from psychedelic and progressive rock, resulting in their characteristic ethereal neo-psychedelic sound. After the release of their last album in 2002, the band appears to have fallen into indefinite hiatus status. IGN ranked their album III as the 15th best progressive rock album.

Band members
 Itakura Mineko - bass, vocals
 Nakao Mine - guitar  
 Toda Fusao - guitar 
 Takahara Tomoko - drums

Discography

Studio albums
 1991 - Angel'in Heavy Syrup I 
 1993 - Angel'in Heavy Syrup II 
 1995 - Angel'in Heavy Syrup III 
 1999 - Angel'in Heavy Syrup IV

Compilation albums
 2002 - The Best of Angel'in Heavy Syrup

References

Japanese progressive rock groups
All-female bands
Japanese psychedelic rock music groups
Musical groups established in 1990
Musical groups from Osaka
1990 establishments in Japan